Karadere Dam is a dam in Kastamonu Province, Turkey, built between 1993 and 2007. The development was backed by the Turkish State Hydraulic Works. Karadere Dam is built for irrigation purposes and can be found between Kastamonu and Taşköprü.

Karadere is an embankment dam; it is earth-filled with a clay-core.

See also
List of dams and reservoirs in Turkey

Notes

References

 

 

 

Dams in Çankırı Province
Dams in Kastamonu Province